Grain (Buğday) is a 2017 film written and directed by Semih Kaplanoğlu.

Plot

In an undefined near future, Professor Erol Erin, a seed geneticist, lives in a city protected from multi-ethnic immigrants by magnetic walls. For unknown reasons, the city's agricultural plantations have been hit by a genetic crisis. In a meeting at the headquarters of Novus Vita, the corporation which employs him, Erol hears about Cemil Akman, a fellow geneticist who wrote a thesis about the recurrent crises affecting genetically modified seeds. Erol sets out on a journey to find him. A journey that will change everything Erol knew.

Production
The film is produced by Kaplanoğlu's company, Kaplan Film; and co-produced by Heimatfilm (Germany), Sophie Dulac Productions (France), The Chimney Pot (Sweden) and Arte France Cinéma (France). The film was shot in Detroit, Michigan, Germany and Turkey.

Cast
 Jean-Marc Barr as Erol Erin
 Ermin Bravo as Cemil Akman
 Grigoriy Dobrygin as Andrei
 Cristina Flutur as Alice
 Lubna Azabal as Beatrice
 Hal Yamanouchi as Leon
 Mila Böhning as Tara
 Rainer Steffen as Professor Ekrem Aktolga
 Hoji Fortuna as Alexandre
 Jarreth J. Merz as Viktor Rerberg
 Nike Maria Vassil as Prof. Asli Yurtcu

References

External links

2017 science fiction films
2010s English-language films
Films set in the future
Post-apocalyptic films
Turkish science fiction films
French science fiction films
German science fiction films
Qatari speculative fiction films
Swedish science fiction films
English-language Turkish films
English-language French films
English-language German films
English-language Qatari films
English-language Swedish films
Films directed by Semih Kaplanoğlu
2010s French films
2010s German films
2010s Swedish films